Mahoning Creek is a  tributary of the Lehigh River in  Schuylkill and Carbon counties, Pennsylvania, in the United States.

Mahoning Creek rises due south of the borough of Summit Hill on the opposite side of the divide in a saddle connecting its two flanking ridgelines, runs parallel to and along the south slopes of Pisgah Mountain, diverges from the Mahoning Hills to run along the north-side slopes of Mauch Chunk Mountain, passes through Mahoning Township, then joins the Lehigh River near the borough of Lehighton.

See also
List of rivers of Pennsylvania

References

Tributaries of the Lehigh River
Rivers of Pennsylvania
Rivers of Carbon County, Pennsylvania
Rivers of Schuylkill County, Pennsylvania